Tenerife Club de Baloncesto was a professional basketball team based in Tenerife, Canary Islands, Spain.

History
Tenerife CB was founded in 1996 after the fusion of some teams of the islands and debuts in LEB Oro in the 1996–97 season, the first of this league.

In the 2002–03 season, Tenerife plays the FIBA Champions' Cup and reaches the second stage. In the same year, Tenerife CB becomes champion of the Copa Príncipe and promotes to Liga ACB, where plays two seasons before being relegated to LEB Oro.

In summer of 2010, Tenerife CB renounces to its berth in LEB Oro due to financial problems and is relegated to Liga EBA. In the next summer and after reaching the promotion playoffs, Tenerife CB achieved a vacant berth to play in LEB Plata, the Spanish basketball third division.

In 2013, the club was not allowed to play the lowest regional category in the Canary Islands.

Season by season

Trophies and awards

Trophies
Copa Príncipe: (1)
2003
Trofeo Gobierno de Canarias: (2)
2002, 2005

Individual awards
LEB Oro MVP
Lawrence Lewis – 2002

Notable players
 Jorge Racca 1 season: '04-'05
 José Ángel Antelo 1 season: '08-'09
 Nacho Yáñez 2 seasons: '02-'04
 Richi Guillén 1 season: '03-'04
 Antwain Barbour 3 seasons: '06-'09
 Alpha Bangura 1 season: '05-'06
 Gustavo Ayón 1 season: '09-'10
 Sitapha Savané 3 seasons: '01-'04
 Christian Maråker 1 season: '08-'09
 Gimel Lewis 1 season: '07-'08
 Ashraf Amaya 1 season: '04
 Bernard Hopkins 2 seasons: '03-'05
 Chris Alexander 1 season: '07-'08
 Kenny Miller 1 season: '02-'03
 Lou Roe 1 season: '09-'10
 Venson Hamilton 1 season: '02-'03

References

Defunct basketball teams in Spain
Former LEB Oro teams
Sport in Tenerife
Basketball teams established in 1996
Former Liga ACB teams
Former LEB Plata teams
Basketball teams disestablished in 2013
Former Liga EBA teams
Basketball teams in the Canary Islands
1996 establishments in Spain
2013 disestablishments in Spain